Ferenc Szedlacsek, also known as Frantisek Sedlacek, (10 October 1898 – 14 November 1973) was a footballer who played international football for both Czechoslovakia and Hungary. He played as a midfielder for DFC Prag, Brooklyn Wanderers and Ferencváros.

References

1898 births
1973 deaths
Czech people of Hungarian descent
Czechoslovak footballers
Czechoslovakia international footballers
Hungarian footballers
Hungary international footballers
Dual internationalists (football)
Brooklyn Wanderers players
Ferencvárosi TC footballers
Association football midfielders
Czechoslovak expatriate footballers
Hungarian expatriate footballers
Expatriate soccer players in the United States
Czechoslovak expatriate sportspeople in the United States
Hungarian expatriate sportspeople in the United States
DFC Prag players